Mutaz or Motaz or Moataz is an Arabic surname and given name. 

Al-Mu'tazz, or al-Muʿtazz bi-ʾllāh (المعتز بالله, "He who is strengthened by God"), the Abbasid caliph from 866 to 869Abdallah ibn al-Mu'tazz''', son of the caliph al-Mu'tazz and a political figure, but is better known as a leading Arabic poet 

It may refer to:

Given name

Mutaz
Mutaz Abdulla, Emirati footballer
Mutaz Essa Barshim (born 1991), Qatari track and field athlete
Mutaz Kabair (born 1980), Sudanese footballer
Mutaz Kailouni (born 1985), Syrian footballer.
Mutaz Hakmi (born 1988), Syrian Programmer, CEO Mutaz.net.

Motaz
Motaz Hawsawi (born 1992), Saudi Arabian footballer 
Motaz Okasha (born 1990), Egyptian basketball player

Motazz
Motazz Moussa (born 1967), Sudanese politician who served as Prime Minister of Sudan from September 2018 until February 2019

Moataz
 Moataz Bellah Abdel-Fattah, Egyptian professor 
 Moataz Ben Amer, Libyan footballer
 Moataz Eno, Egyptian footballer
 Moataz Yaseen, Jordanian footballer

Mootaz
 Mootaz Jounaidi, Lebanese footballer

Surname
 Hana Moataz, Egyptian squash player